Gymnopilus austropicreus is a species of mushroom-forming fungus in the family Hymenogastraceae. It is found in Australia.

See also

 List of Gymnopilus species

References

austropicreus
Fungi described in 2001
Fungi of Australia